Warby Range State Park was a Victorian state park just north of Glenrowan. In 2010 the park became part of the newly declared Warby-Ovens National Park. There are two basic campgrounds, and many other sites for true bush camping.

History
The 400 m rocky escarpments are believed to have been used by the Kelly gang as a lookout for robbing wagons loaded with gold, heading to Melbourne and Port Phillip Bay.  In 2002, the park was expanded to include the state forest of Killawarra as part of a program of protecting Box-Ironbark forests.

Environment
The park is part of the Warby-Chiltern Box-Ironbark Region Important Bird Area, identified as such by BirdLife International because of its importance for the conservation of Box-Ironbark forest ecosystems and several species of threatened woodland birds dependent on them.
The ranges run north-to-south, allowing plant and animal species to migrate from the Australian Alps to the riverina plains, Murray River and arid regions.

References

State parks of Victoria (Australia)
Important Bird Areas of Victoria (Australia)
Box-ironbark forest
Parks of Hume (region)